Avery Township is one of twelve townships in Humboldt County, Iowa, USA.  As of the 2000 census, its population was 316.

History
Avery Township was organized in 1873. It is named for O. F. Avery, a pioneer settler.

Geography

Cities, towns, villages
 Bradgate

Adjacent townships
 Wacousta Township (north)
 Delana Township (northeast)
 Rutland Township (east)
 Corinth Township (southeast)
 Weaver Township (south)
 Lake Township, Pocahontas County (southwest)
 Garfield Township, Pocahontas County (west)
 Des Moines Township, Pocahontas County (northwest)

Cemeteries
The township does not contain any cemeteries.

Political districts
 Iowa's 4th congressional district
 State House District 4

References
 United States Census Bureau 2008 TIGER/Line Shapefiles
 United States Board on Geographic Names (GNIS)
 United States National Atlas

External links
 US-Counties.com
 City-Data.com

Townships in Humboldt County, Iowa
Townships in Iowa
Populated places established in 1873
1873 establishments in Iowa